James Charles Cox (born May 28, 1950) is a former backup second baseman in Major League Baseball who played for the Montreal Expos between 1973 and 1976. He batted and threw right-handed.

In a four-season career, Cox was a .215 hitter (66-for-307) with three home runs and 33 RBI in 110 games played, including 33 runs, 11 doubles, two triples and three stolen bases.

External links
, or Retrosheet, or Pelota Binaria (Venezuelan Winter League)

1950 births
Living people
American expatriate baseball players in Canada
Baseball players from Illinois
Bloomington High School (Bloomington, Illinois) alumni
Cardenales de Lara players
American expatriate baseball players in Venezuela
Denver Bears players
Iowa Hawkeyes baseball players
Major League Baseball second basemen
Memphis Blues players
Montreal Expos players
Peninsula Whips players
Québec Carnavals players
Sportspeople from Bloomington, Illinois